Belcastel is a commune in the Aveyron department in southern France.

The village is medieval in character, with cobbled streets and lauze-roofed (stone tiled) houses. The bulk of the village and the castle (Château de Belcastel) are situated on the steep north bank of the river Aveyron. Several buildings including the 15th-century church are on the south side of the river, with a similarly aged bridge (pictured) connecting the two. A ruined fort, Fort du Lourdou, can also be found about a kilometre west of the village on the south bank of the river at the Roc d'Anglars. It was nominated as one of the "most beautiful villages of France" (Les Plus Beaux Villages de France), and the local council regularly hosts watercolour competitions and art exhibitions during the summer.

Population

See also
Communes of the Aveyron department

References

External links

 Tourism in Belcastel
 Photographs of Belcastel
 Route des Seigneurs du Rouergue 
 Château de Belcastel Official Website
 The Roc d'Anglars

Communes of Aveyron
Plus Beaux Villages de France
Aveyron communes articles needing translation from French Wikipedia